Lt. Gen. Murad Ali Murad is a military personnel in Afghanistan, previously serving as Deputy Interior Minister for Security. The ceremony took place at the Ministry of Defense on 18 May 2017.

Functions 
Gen. Murad has been responsible for the Afghanistan National Army since the fall of the Taliban regime in 2001 in various parts of the country.
He worked as Deputy Chief of Army Staff Afghanistan of the Afghan National Army, appointed to this command since 2015 after succeeding General Sher Mohammad Karimi. He was dismissed on 22 May 2018. Murad then briefly served as the commander of the Kabul garrison. He was appointed as governor of Daykundi Province on 13 July 2021.

 Deputy Commander of 203rd Corps (Afghanistan) (2006-2007)
 Commander 209th Corps (Afghanistan) (2007-2010)
 Commander of Afghan Ground Forces (2010-2015)
 Deputy chief of staff of the Afghan National Army (ANA) (2015-2018)
 Deputy interior minister for security (18 May 2017)

References

External links 

 Afghan general urges security agreement with U.S. be signed soon United Press International
 Murad Ali Murad's Facebook account
 Murad Ali Murad's Twitter account

1960 births
Generals
Living people
Hazara people
Hazara military personnel
Afghan military personnel
People from Ghor Province
Military personnel of the War in Afghanistan (2001–2021)
Afghan military officers